Sándor Brodszky (Tóalmás, 1819 - Budapest, 1901) was a Hungarian painter whose works are featured in the Hungarian National Gallery.

See also 
 Early Evening Landscape

References 

1819 births
1901 deaths
People from Pest County
Artists from Budapest
19th-century Hungarian painters
Hungarian male painters
19th-century Hungarian male artists